George Johnson was an American football coach. He served as the head football coach at Bucknell University from 1915 to 1917, compiling a record of 8–20–4. Johnson coached football at Northeast High School in Philadelphia before succeeding George Cockill as head football coach at Bucknell in 1915.

Head coaching record

College

References

Year of birth missing
Year of death missing
Bucknell Bison football coaches
High school football coaches in Pennsylvania